Autumn of Their Years is a compilation album by American rock band The Beau Brummels. It was released in 1994 by Big Beat Records, and re-released in 2003 by Ace Records. The album consists of 26 songs recorded by the band during their stint at Autumn Records, including previously unreleased demos and outtakes.

Music 
Autumn of Their Years features 26 songs recorded by the Beau Brummels from 1964 to 1966. 
The compilation contains unreleased songs and alternate takes from the band's Autumn Records period. 
Ten songs—including "She Sends Me", "Dream On", and "Love is Just a Game"—previously appeared on the 1982 Rhino collection From the Vaults, while the remainder of the album consists of sixteen unreleased tracks, including demo versions of the band's early singles "Laugh, Laugh", "Just a Little", and "Still in Love with You Baby".

Critical reception 

Richie Unterberger of Allmusic wrote that the album has "a lot of fine moments, but actually a bit much for all but hardcore fans", and that "the best cuts ... were already available on From the Vaults". Regarding the previously unreleased demos, Unterberger said they "aren't as good, production-wise ... or material-wise", and called "Tomorrow Is Another Day" the highlight of the album, "showcasing Sal Valentino's rich and moving vocals".

Track listing

References

External links 
 [ Autumn of Their Years] at Allmusic

1994 compilation albums
The Beau Brummels albums